The 1st News of the World Trophy, previously known as the Glover Trophy, was a motor race, run to Formula One rules, held on 30 March 1964 at Goodwood Circuit, England. The race was run over 42 laps of the circuit, and was won by British driver Jim Clark in a Lotus 25, after Graham Hill dropped out having led for 40 laps.

Results

 Three other cars were entered, two for SEFAC Ferrari, and one for the Brabham Racing Organisation. All three were withdrawn before the event, with no drivers named.

References
 "The Grand Prix Who's Who", Steve Small, 1995.
 "The Formula One Record Book", John Thompson, 1974.

News of the World Trophy
Glover Trophy
News of the World
20th century in West Sussex
News of the World Trophy
News of the World Trophy